Kayla Laine Ard (born February 10, 1984) is an American college basketball coach who is currently women's basketball head coach at Utah State.

Early life and education
Born in Hammond, Louisiana, Ard grew up in nearby Loranger and graduated from Loranger High School in 2002. She played basketball for one season at Chipola College, then transferred to Southeastern Louisiana University, where she played three games in the 2004–05 season, averaging 3.0 points per game. She graduated from Southeastern Louisiana in 2010 with a bachelor's degree in general studies, and later earned a master's degree in psychology from the University of Phoenix in 2013.

Coaching career
Ard started her coaching career as assistant coach of the AAU Domino's Basketball program in New Orleans, Louisiana from 2003 to 2005, followed by one season as a coach at Hammond High School (2005-06 season), and head coach of the Hammond Tornadoes AAU organization in 2007. After coaching at Hammond, Ard was cast in the lead role of a Gatorade commercial, which aired from 2008 to 2009.

Ard was then a recruiter and assistant coach at Pensacola State College in Florida during the 2010–11 and 2011–12 seasons, then spent a year at Troy University, working under Chanda Rigby and athletic director John Hartwell.  From 2013 to 2015, Ard was an assistant coach at Clemson University, then served as the assistant coach and recruiting coordinator at the University of Dayton from 2015 to 2017.

From 2017 to 2020, she was the associate head coach, recruiting coordinator, and offensive coordinator at the University of Denver, including 11 games in the 2019 season as the interim head coach.

On March 23, 2020, it was announced that she had been hired as the head coach for the Utah State University's basketball program. After a 4 win season and last place conference finish in Ard's debut season, the team improved to 11-19, and finished 9th of 11 teams in the conference.  However, in an interesting turn of events, 10 players from her team entered the transfer portal following the 2021–22 season, leaving the team with only 2 returners (both reserves). In 2022-23, Ard's team amassed 26 losses, tied for the most by a Utah State women's basketball team in school history. This resulted in another last place finish in the conference.

Head coaching record

References

1984 births
Living people
American women's basketball coaches
Chipola Indians women's basketball players
Denver Pioneers women's basketball coaches
Southeastern Louisiana Lions basketball players
Sportspeople from Hammond, Louisiana
University of Phoenix alumni
Junior college women's basketball coaches in the United States
High school basketball coaches in Louisiana
Basketball coaches from Louisiana
Basketball players from Louisiana
Dayton Flyers women's basketball coaches
Clemson Tigers women's basketball coaches
Utah State Aggies women's basketball coaches